"Ko Ko Bop" is a song by South Korean–Chinese boy band Exo, released on July 18, 2017, as the lead single of their fourth studio album The War. It was released in Korean and Chinese versions by their label SM Entertainment. It was the first Exo single not to feature member Lay due to his extended hiatus.

Release and composition
Produced by Styalz Fuego, "Ko Ko Bop" is described as an energetic reggae song with rhythmical reggae and bass guitar sounds. "Ko Ko Bop" was co-written by Exo members Chen, Chanyeol and Baekhyun. It was released digitally on July 18, 2017 and physically on July 19 along with the album. According to Chanyeol, the term "Ko Ko Bop" means "Fun Dancing".

Talking to Billboard about producing the song, Styalz Fuego stated that while writing the song the other composers were going with a reggae type of song, but after adding the drop after the chorus the song took a different distraction, and they settled for a reggae-pop song afterwards. The composers stated that they thought the song would be for a girl group because Shaylen Carroll, one of the composers, a female, did the demo, but eventually it went to Exo. Fuego stated "The song was actually in a higher key – I think three semitones higher – so it was more fitted for a female group originally."

About writing the lyrics of the song, Carroll stated: "When I was recording some melody ideas I kept on singing nonsense phrases and one was 'Shimmy shimmy Ko Ko Bop', which we all thought was super quirky and catchy. So we built off that and turned it into something real". Carroll went and described the "Ko Ko Bop" as a song that is about "not worrying about things", "going with the flow" and "not worrying about the haters". Chen and Baekhyun also talked with Billboard about writing the lyrics of the song, Chen stated that the Baekhyun, Chanyeol and himself each wrote the lyrics separately and worked on putting the lyrics together for the song afterwards by selecting the lyrics that would suit the song the best. Baekhyun stated "I wanted my lyrics to have people to become more carefree, release their stress and dance away with the music."

Music video

A teaser of "Ko Ko Bop" music video was released on July 17, 2017 by SM Entertainment. The Korean and Chinese music videos of "Ko Ko Bop" were released on July 18. The music video was filmed in Seoul, South Korea.The music video shows the boys spending a day having fun as the name of the suggests "Ko Ko Bop" meaning fun dancing.

The Korean music video hit one million views in its first hour of release and 8,833,869 in 24 hours. Three days after its release, the music video hit one million likes; in August 2020, it reached four million likes. On December 12, 2017, the music video surpassed 100 million views on YouTube, reaching 200 million views on January 25, 2019, and 300 million on February 28, 2021.

Promotion
On July 8, Exo's official Twitter account had been activated to public, through which SM Entertainment revealed the first teaser video for the album. Twitter Music also  created three customized hashtags with Exo's new tropical logo for Exo including #KoKoBop, #TheWarEXO and #EXO. Fans also welcomed them with 11 million tweets worldwide. Also on July 8, Exo's official Instagram account opened by posting the three versions of Exo's new album logo. On July 10, the album's title was announced to be The War. From July 9 to July 16, the album's track list was revealed one by one through a series of teaser videos each featuring one member.

Exo began promoting "Ko Ko Bop" on South Korean music shows from July 20. On August 5, Exo performed "Ko Ko Bop" in Hong Kong during the SM Town Live World Tour VI concert. Exo also performed at a-Nation on August 26, Music Bank World Tour in Jakarta on September 2 and during Lotte Duty Free Family Festival on September 15.

Reception

Commercial performance
"Ko Ko Bop" debuted at number one  on five major realtime music charts, including Genie, Olleh, Bugs, Naver and Melon, making Exo the first K-pop group to enter the Melon Realtime Chart at the top after chart changes were implemented on February 27, 2017. The other album tracks debuted in the top nine. It was reported that multiple servers crashed, due to the number of fans streaming at the same time.

"Ko Ko Bop" scored the second-highest amount of unique listeners by any artist on Melon during the first hour after the system change that barred any artist from releasing music at midnight. It also became the highest for an idol group (Male or Female) in 2017 with 78,121 unique listeners during the first hour of release.

"Ko Ko Bop" topped Gaon Digital Chart for four non-consecutive weeks, making Exo the first artist to do so in 2017. Exo also became the third idol group to chart at number one for four weeks, as well as the first male idol group to do so. The song also stayed at number one on the Chinese music chart Alibaba for three consecutive weeks, as well as number two on Billboard's US World Digital Songs and China V Chart.

The War reached number one on iTunes in 42 countries in total. According to Korean media outlet, Xportsnews, "Ko Ko Bop" additionally topped 155 iTunes charts worldwide, including K-pop charts and general pop charts, as well as all-genre single charts.

For the month of August, "Ko Ko Bop" topped the Gaon Monthly Digital and BGM Charts, making Exo the first group in 2017 and the fifth boy group since 2012 to top the chart.

Public reception
Exo's fans began a viral Internet video trend called Ko Ko Bop Challenge where people dance the quick hip thrust succession choreography of the song to the lyrics "Down down baby". The hashtag #KoKoBopChallenge was used for popular social media platforms such as Twitter, Instagram and Weibo.

Charts

Weekly charts

Monthly chart

Yearly chart

Sales

Download

Streaming

Accolades

Release history

Notes

References

Exo songs
2017 songs
2017 singles
Korean-language songs
Chinese-language songs
SM Entertainment singles
Internet memes introduced in 2017
Gaon Digital Chart number-one singles
Billboard Korea K-Pop number-one singles